Kýže Sliz is the fifth album by the Slovak punk rock/comedy rock band Horkýže Slíže, released in October 2002. It was a commercial and critical success which received Platinum status in Slovakia and also did well in the Czech Republic. It is the first album on which the drummer Marek Viršík plays, replacing Martin Košovan.

Track list

Personnel
 Peter Hrivňák (Kuko) – vocals, bass guitar
 Mário Sabo (Sabotér) – guitar, backing vocals
 Juraj Štefánik (Doktor) – guitar, backing vocals
 Marek Viršík (Vandel) – drums, backing vocals

Guests
 Stano Dančiak, Gabika, Anita Ezis (track 1)
 Inguna Grase (tracks 1, 14)
 Gréta Vargová (tracks 2, 8, 12)
 Soňa Petrová (tracks 8, 12)
 Conrad Toft (track 8)
 Miriam Štefániková, Katarína Hrivňáková (track 12)
 Peter Böhm (track 13)
 Ján Šery - accordion (track 12)
 František Adamík - scratch (track 7)
 Marta Kárová - cello (track 14)
 Igor Duška - turn track (track 5)

External links 
Horkýže Slíže official website

2002 albums
Horkýže Slíže albums